3908 Nyx is an Amor and Mars-crosser asteroid. It was discovered by Hans-Emil Schuster on August 6, 1980, and is named after Nyx, the Greek goddess of the night, after which Pluto's moon Nix is also named. It is 1–2 km in diameter and is a V-type asteroid, meaning that it may be a fragment of the asteroid 4 Vesta.

Observations
In 2000, radar observations conducted at the Arecibo and Goldstone observatories produced a model of Nyx's shape; the asteroid can best be described as spherical but with many protruding lumps.

Name
To avoid confusion with 3908 Nyx, Pluto's moon Nix was changed from the initial proposal of the classical spelling Nyx, to Nix.

See also
 3551 Verenia
 4 Vesta
 4055 Magellan
 HED meteorite
 V-type asteroid

References

External links
 
 
 

003908
Discoveries by Hans-Emil Schuster
Named minor planets
003908
003908
19800806
Nyx